Margaret Herold Blitch (28 July 1934 – 2 February 2021) was an American politician.

Blitch was born in Passaic, New Jersey, to parents Francis Hyacinth Herold and Marian Alda Burrows on 28 July 1934. Her father later remarried, to Rose Anne. She married Brooks E. Blitch III, who was the son of Erwin and Iris Faircloth Blitch. In 1976, Peg Blitch was named a judge of the probate court in Clinch County, Georgia. She remained on the bench until 1980. Between 1990 and 1992, she served a single term on the Georgia House of Representatives, then was a member of the Georgia Senate until 2005, when she opted to retire from the state legislature. During her tenure as on the Georgia General Assembly, Blitch lived in Homerville and was affiliated with the Democratic Party. She was elected mayor of Homerville in November 2009. Blitch died on 2 February 2021.

References

1934 births
2021 deaths
Democratic Party Georgia (U.S. state) state senators
20th-century American women politicians
20th-century American politicians
20th-century American judges
Women state legislators in Georgia (U.S. state)
Georgia (U.S. state) state court judges
Democratic Party members of the Georgia House of Representatives
People from Clinch County, Georgia
People from Passaic, New Jersey
Women mayors of places in Georgia (U.S. state)
Probate court judges in the United States
20th-century American women judges